Jennifer Euston is an American casting director.

Career 
Most recently, she won an Emmy for casting Orange Is the New Black in 2014.

Casting director 
(partial list)

Television

 Orange Is the New Black, 2013-2014
 Girls, 2012
 The Pacific, 2010
 Unbreakable Kimmy Schmidt, 2015-
 GLOW, 2017- ,
 Teenage Bounty Hunters, 2020- ,

Film 
 Sleepwalk with Me, 2012
 Scott Pilgrim vs. the World, 2010

References

External links 

 

American casting directors
Women casting directors
1974 births
People from West Caldwell, New Jersey
Living people